Turkmenistan–Iran pipeline may refer to:
 Korpeje–Kordkuy pipeline
 Dauletabad–Salyp Yar pipeline